The 1990 UC Santa Barbara Gauchos football team represented the University of California, Santa Barbara (UCSB) as an independent during the 1990 NCAA Division III football season. Led by first-year head coach Rick Candaele, the Gauchos compiled a record of 6–4 and were outscored by their opponents 271 to 248 for the season. The team played home games at Harder Stadium in Santa Barbara, California.

Schedule

References

UC Santa Barbara
UC Santa Barbara Gauchos football seasons
UC Santa Barbara Gauchos football